Cyclobutyne (C4H4) is a hydrocarbon molecule containing a triple bond within a four carbon atom ring.  This cycloalkyne is very unstable due to its high ring strain and has not been isolated in the pure state.  However, osmium coordination complexes containing cyclobutyne have been synthesized.

See also 
Cyclobutene

References

Alkynes
Four-membered rings